Rev. John Pinasco, SJ, (11 June 1837 – 9 March 1897), was born in the vicinity of Genoa and entered the Jesuit Novitiate at Bonaecola in 1853. In 1858, he was sent to the Jesuit college at Stonyhurst to study philosophy with Rev. Father Bayma, SJ, one of the premier professors of the Society of Jesus in Europe.

Pinasco came directly to Santa Clara College in 1860, where he taught until 1876 with a four-year break for additional theological training at Georgetown University between 1868 and 1872.

In 1876, he moved to the University of San Francisco, where he served as president. Thereafter, he twice served Santa Clara College in the same capacity, (1880-1883 and 1888-1893 respectively).

Fr. Pinasco died at the Sacred Heart Novitiate in Los Gatos, aged 59.

References

Santa Clara College (corporate authorship). Souvenir of Santa Clara College. Santa Clara, CA: University Press, 1901. (Page 20)

1837 births
1897 deaths
Georgetown University alumni
19th-century Italian Jesuits
Clergy from Genoa
Presidents of Santa Clara University
Presidents of the University of San Francisco
People educated at Stonyhurst College
Italian emigrants to the United States